Kor or KOR may refer to:

Codes
 kor, ISO 3166-1 alpha-3 and IOC country code for South Korea
 kor, ISO 639-2 code for the Korean language
 kor, ISO 639-3 code for Modern Korean

Places
 Kor River, in Fars Province, Iran
 Kor, East Azerbaijan, a village in Iran
 Kor-e Sofla, a village in East Azerbaijan Province, Iran
 South Korea, ISO Alpha-3 code

People

Surname 
 Avshalom Kor (born 1950), Israeli linguist
 Eva Mozes Kor (1934–2019), Romanian-born American Holocaust survivor
 Layton Kor (1938–2013), American rock climber
 Paul Kor (1926–2001), Israeli painter, graphic designer, children's author, and illustrator
 Rasoul Kor (born 1989), Iranian footballer

Given name 
 Kor Sarr (1975–2019), Senegalese football player and manager

Stage name 
 KOR, a professional wrestler in Vermont(USA)

In fiction 
 Kor (Star Trek), a Klingon character in the fictional Star Trek universe
 Kor (Forgotten Realms), a fictional deity of the Al-Qadim campaign setting from Dungeons & Dragons
 Kimagure Orange Road, a 1984 anime series
 Kôr, a fictitious African lost city, setting of H. Rider Haggard's novel She
 Kor of the Metal Heads, a character in the video game Jak II
 Kor, a fantasy race of humanoids found in the Magic: The Gathering card game
 Kor Meteor, the protagonist of Tales of Hearts

Other uses
 Kor or Homer, an ancient Hebrew unit
 Komitet Obrony Robotników ("Workers' Defence Committee"), a Polish civil society group
 κ-opioid receptor, a human protein

See also